"Dare You to Move" is a single by American alternative rock band Switchfoot from their fourth studio album, The Beautiful Letdown (2003). The song was originally called "I Dare You to Move", and was on the album Learning to Breathe, but the band decided to remix it and put it on The Beautiful Letdown. This track received considerable radio airplay, and its accompanying music videos saw play on MTV, VH1, FUSE TV, and other mainstream channels. "Dare You to Move" was released to Christian radio on February 6, 2004, and sent to modern rock radio the following month. It peaked at number 17 on the US Billboard Hot 100, becoming Switchfoot's second top-20 single, surpassing the success of their breakthrough single, "Meant to Live", in the United States.

Appearing as the first track on Learning to Breathe and the fifth track on The Beautiful Letdown, "Dare You to Move" was a long-lasting hit and eventually certified gold in April 2005. The song received positive reviews from critics, and was ranked number 73 on Rhapsody's list of the Top 100 Tracks of the Decade. "Dare You to Move" was co-produced by Charlie Peacock—who discovered Switchfoot and signed the band to its first record deal—and John Fields.

Song history
Written by Switchfoot singer and songwriter Jon Foreman, it was originally produced solely by Charlie Peacock and recorded as the opening track for Switchfoot's 2000 album Learning to Breathe, and also appeared on the A Walk to Remember soundtrack, which featured several other Switchfoot songs. The song can be heard in season one, episode eight and in season two, episode five of One Tree Hill as well as the documentary Warren Miller's Higher Ground.

Bassist Tim Foreman remarked that upon finishing the song, all the band members knew that they had really created something powerful. Jon Foreman (primary songwriter) said that "sometimes it still can move him to tears, and that he's glad it got a second chance, (on The Beautiful Letdown)." The reason the band gave it a rewrite was "that song hadn't lived its shelf life yet". In addition, "after having played it a couple years live, I feel like we've got a better grip of how we want it to be on a record," he said.

Foreman has called it "a defining song" for the band: "It's me talking to myself and I think a lot of times I feel stagnant and stuck in the same place, and 'Dare You to Move' is kind of a song for myself to get me up and get me moving and tackling a new part of life."

Musical structure
The tune is played in the key of E major, beginning with a jangling strummed guitar riff and a driving rocky chorus. The song has a basic structure consisting of an intro, verse, chorus, verse, chorus, bridge, chorus. Multiple versions were released, varying slightly in dynamics and instrumental structure.

Music videos
There are two official music videos: One depicts a man running against a large crowd of people while the other features a surfer who is being resuscitated on the beach while different parts of his life are shown. The second version of the video peaked at No. 2 on VH1's Top 20 Countdown.

Awards
In 2005, the track won two Dove Awards: Rock/Contemporary Recorded Song of the Year and Short Form Music Video of the Year, at the 36th GMA Dove Awards. It was also nominated for Song of the Year.

Track listings

Australian and New Zealand CD single
 "Dare You to Move"
 "Monday Comes Around"
 "Meant to Live" (live)

UK CD1
 "Dare You to Move"
 "The Beautiful Letdown" (live)

UK CD2
 "Dare You to Move" (album version)
 "On Fire" (live)
 "Gone" (live)
 "Dare You to Move" (CD-ROM video)

Charts

Certifications

Release history

Song versions
"Dare You to Move" has five recorded versions that have appeared on soundtracks, CDs, and singles:
 The Learning to Breathe version, which was released in 2000. It is characterized by quieter, less driven instrumentation. It also appears on the A Walk to Remember soundtrack single.
 The Beautiful Letdown album version, which was released in 2003. It featured a brand new mix of the song (heavier electric guitars) and stronger vocals from Jon Foreman, ultimately resulting in a more complete and emphatic ending. Also, the title was changed to "Dare You to Move", dropping the "I" from the original title.
 A finalized radio-edit remix done in 2004, which slightly tweaked the Beautiful Letdown album version to allow for heavier drum and electric guitar accompaniment throughout the entire song. This is the version which has been featured on most alternative rock music stations while the original The Beautiful Letdown album version was featured on top 40 and Hot AC music stations. It is also the same version that is heard in the first version music video for this song. In 2007, it was made available for purchase on the iTunes-exclusive deluxe edition of The Beautiful Letdown.
 There is also a live version of the song on the exclusive iTunes EP – Live EP, which was recorded in San Diego.
 The Japanese version of the album Nothing Is Sound has an alternate version, which is longer than the original, and features different instrumentation and arrangements from the previous versions.

References

External links
 Music video (version one)
 Music video (version two)
 Switchfoot

Switchfoot songs
2000s ballads
2003 songs
2004 singles
Columbia Records singles
Music videos directed by Marc Webb
Post-grunge songs
Rock ballads
Song recordings produced by John Fields (record producer)
Songs written by Jon Foreman
Sony BMG singles